GLQ may refer to:

 GLQ (journal), a scholarly journal
 Glasgow Queen Street railway station, in Scotland